Harpalus basanicus is a species of ground beetle in the subfamily Harpalinae. It was described by J.R. Sahlberg in 1911.

References

basanicus
Beetles described in 1911